Hamdi Nagguez (born 28 October 1992) is a Tunisian professional footballer who plays as a right back.

Club career
Nagguez was born in Menzel Kamel, Tunisia, and started his career at Étoile Sportive du Sahel in 2013. During his spell there, he became popular by the fans despite being one of the youngest players in the team. He scored 6 goals with his team in 78 appearances. He was decisive in deciding many titles for his team like 2015 CAF Confederation Cup, Tunisian League, and Tunisian Cup.

International career
Hamdi Nagguez has joined to the Tunisian national team in 2015 during the  2017 Africa Cup of Nations qualification. His international debut was against Liberia on 5 September 2015 when they lost (0–1). He was also decisive in the finals of the African Cup after an assist to Taha Yassine Khenissi against Zimbabwe. He was seriously injured and put him out of action for a long time, forcing him to absent from the match Egypt in 2019 Africa Cup of Nations qualification, but returned in the matches of the DR Cogo and Guinea in 2018 FIFA World Cup qualification.

In June 2018 he was named in Tunisia’s 23-man squad for the 2018 FIFA World Cup in Russia.

Career statistics

International

Honours
ES Sahel
Tunisian Ligue Professionnelle 1: 2016
Tunisian Cup: 2012, 2014, 2015
CAF Confederation Cup: 2015

Zamalek
 Egypt Cup: 2017–18, 2018–19
 Saudi-Egyptian Super Cup: 2018
 CAF Confederation Cup: 2018–19

References

External links

Tunisian footballers
1992 births
Living people
2017 Africa Cup of Nations players
Étoile Sportive du Sahel players
Zamalek SC players
FK Sūduva Marijampolė players
Espérance Sportive de Tunis players
Al-Ahli Saudi FC players
People from Monastir Governorate
Association football central defenders
Association football fullbacks
2018 FIFA World Cup players
Tunisia international footballers
Egyptian Premier League players
Tunisian Ligue Professionnelle 1 players
A Lyga players
Saudi Professional League players
Expatriate footballers in Egypt
Expatriate footballers in Lithuania
Expatriate footballers in Saudi Arabia
Tunisian expatriate sportspeople in Egypt
Tunisian expatriate sportspeople in Lithuania
Tunisian expatriate sportspeople in Saudi Arabia